Hadlow Cricket Club was one of the early English cricket clubs, formed in the early to mid eighteenth century.  Hadlow is a village in the Medway valley near Tonbridge in Kent.

The historic club
A cricket club at Hadlow was known to exist during the 18th century and players from it known to have played during the 1747 English cricket season. F S Ashley-Cooper referred to a quote which described it as "a famous parish for cricket". The Penny London Post reported that a match was to be played between the club and Dartford Cricket Club as "the deciding match". Five players from the club played five from Slindon Cricket Club during the same year.

The last mention of the original Hadlow club is a match against Addington Cricket Club in 1751.

The modern club
Cricket is still played at Hadlow. The modern club was first mentioned in 1819 and the present ground is located off Common Road, to the north of the village. The pavilion dates from 1864 and cost £42.10s to build. The club fields teams in the Kent County Village League.

References

External links
 Hadlow Cricket Club website

Former senior cricket clubs
English cricket teams in the 18th century
Sports clubs established in the 18th century
Hadlow
English club cricket teams
Cricket in Kent